The 1901 Navy Midshipmen football team was an American football team that represented the United States Naval Academy as an independent during the 1901 college football season. In it first season under head coach Art Hillebrand, the team compiled a 6–4–1 record and outscored opponents by a total of 113 to 81.

President Theodore Roosevelt attended the Army–Navy Game in Philadelphia on December 1. A newspaper account noted: "For the first time in the history of foot-ball a President of the United States added dignity to a noted contest by his presence."

Schedule

References

Navy
Navy Midshipmen football seasons
Navy Midshipmen football